Coleophora fuscosquamata is a moth of the family Coleophoridae. It is found in central Australia near the border between Western Australia and the Northern Territory.

References

Moths of Australia
fuscosquamata
Moths described in 1996